The 1971 Texas Tech Red Raiders football team represented Texas Tech University in the Southwest Conference (SWC) during the 1971 NCAA University Division football season. In their second season under head coach Jim Carlen, the Red Raiders compiled a 4–7 record (2–5 against conference opponents), finished in seventh place in the SWC, and were outscored by opponents by a combined total of 138 to 131. The team's statistical leaders included Jimmy Carmichael with 423 passing yards, Doug McCutchen with 548 rushing yards, and Johnny Odom with 242 receiving yards. The team played its home games at Clifford B. & Audrey Jones Stadium.

Schedule

References

Texas Tech
Texas Tech Red Raiders football seasons
Texas Tech Red Raiders football